Joachim Lafosse (born 18 January 1975) is a Belgian film director and screenwriter.

Career 
Lafosse studied at the IAD (Institut des arts de diffusion) at Louvain-la-Neuve between 1997 and 2001.  His graduation film Tribu, a 24-minute short, won the best Belgian short subject category at the 2001 Namur Film Festival. His first full-length feature, Folie Privée (2004), won the FIPRESCI award at the Bratislava International Film Festival., and the semi-autobiographical Ça rend heureux (2006) took the Grand Prix at the 2007 Premiers Plans d'Angers festival.  2006 also saw the release of Nue Propriété, starring Isabelle Huppert and brothers Jérémie and Yannick Renier, which debuted at the Venice Film Festival where it was nominated for the Golden Lion and won a SIGNIS award. The film received the André Cavens Award for Best Film by the Belgian Film Critics Association (UCC). For his film Private Lessons (Élève libre), he was nominated for two Magritte Awards in the category of Best Director and Best Screenplay.

His 2012 film Loving Without Reason competed in the Un Certain Regard section at the 2012 Cannes Film Festival. The film was selected as the Belgian entry for the Best Foreign Language Oscar at the 85th Academy Awards, but it did not make the final shortlist. It was nominated for seven Magritte Awards, winning four, including Best Film and Best Director for Lafosse.

Filmography 
2000: Égoïste Nature (short feature)
2000: Tribu (short feature)
2001: Scarface (documentary)
2004: Folie Privée
2006: Ça rend heureux
2006: Private Property
2008: Private Lessons
2012: Our Children (also known as Loving Without Reason)
2015: The White Knights
2016: After Love
2021: The Restless

References

External links

1975 births
Living people
People from Uccle
Belgian film directors
Belgian screenwriters
Magritte Award winners